Konosirus punctatus is a species of fish in the family Clupeidae, the herrings and sardines. It is the only member of the monotypic genus Konosirus. Its common names include dotted gizzard shad and konoshiro gizzard shad. It is native to the northwestern Pacific Ocean, where it occurs along the Asian coastline.

It has a somewhat compressed body and a slightly projecting snout. There is a dark spot behind the gills, with several lines of dark dots next to it.

This species occurs in the ocean, and it can be found near land in bays. It enters shallow brackish waters to spawn.

This is a food fish of some commercial importance, particularly in Asia.

As Food
Known as "Jeon-eo", 전어, in Korea, these fish are a seasonal specialty and consumed in a wide variety of ways including raw, grilled, dried, etc. There are several "Jeon-eo" regional festivals in fall which attract large crowds. It is known as "Konoshiro" (コノシロ) in Japan. Konosirus punctatus is also an important fish consumed in China, Japan, India and Polynesia.

References

External links
  - City of Bosung's Shad Festival
  - City of Hadong's Shad Festival
  - Sumjin River Festival
  - City of Sacheon Shad Festival

dotted gizzard shad
Konosirus
Konosirus
Konosirus
Marine fauna of East Asia
dotted gizzard shad
Taxa named by David Starr Jordan
Taxa named by John Otterbein Snyder
Edible fish